The Winter Palace in St. Petersburg, Russia, was the winter residence of the Russian tsars and now part of the State Hermitage Museum.

Winter Palace may also refer to:

 Winter Palace of the Bogd Khan, Ulan Bator
 Winter Palace of Prince Eugene, Vienna
 Winter Palace Hotel, Luxor, a hotel on the banks of the River Nile in Egypt
 Winter Palace, a song from Trans-Siberian Orchestra’s 2012 EP Dreams of Fireflies (On a Christmas Night)